In Greek mythology, Ambracia (Ancient Greek: Άμβρακία) was a Oeachalian princess and daughter of King Melaneus, son of Apollo and Oechalia, and thus, sister of Eurytus. The city of Ambracia in Epirus was named after her.

Notes

References 

 Antoninus Liberalis, The Metamorphoses of Antoninus Liberalis translated by Francis Celoria (Routledge 1992). Online version at the Topos Text Project.
 Pausanias, Description of Greece with an English Translation by W.H.S. Jones, Litt.D., and H.A. Ormerod, M.A., in 4 Volumes. Cambridge, MA, Harvard University Press; London, William Heinemann Ltd. 1918. . Online version at the Perseus Digital Library
Pausanias, Graeciae Descriptio. 3 vols. Leipzig, Teubner. 1903.  Greek text available at the Perseus Digital Library.
Princesses in Greek mythology

Epirotic mythology